The Lago de las Minas frog (Lithobates chichicuahutla) is a species of frog in the family Ranidae. It is endemic to the Las Minas Lake (Lago de las Minas) in the Oriental Basin of Puebla, Mexico. Its natural habitat is vegetation surrounding the lake. It is threatened by deterioration in the quality of habitat surrounding the lake as well as the decline in lake surface level caused by groundwater extraction.

References

Lithobates
Endemic amphibians of Mexico
Tehuacán Valley matorral
Taxonomy articles created by Polbot
Amphibians described in 1996